Eumarozia is a genus of moths belonging to the subfamily Olethreutinae of the family Tortricidae.

Species
Eumarozia beckeri Clarke, 1973
Eumarozia elaeanthes (Meyrick, 1927)
Eumarozia malachitana (Zeller, 1875)

See also
List of Tortricidae genera

References

External links
tortricidae.com

Olethreutini
Tortricidae genera